Narigan Run is a  long 1st order tributary to Buffalo Creek in Washington County, Pennsylvania.  This is the only stream of this name in the United States.

Course
Narigan Run rises about 2 miles east-northeast of Frogtown, Washington County, Pennsylvania, in Washington County and then flows generally south to join Buffalo Creek about 1.5 miles east of Dunsfort.

Watershed
Narigan Run drains  of area, receives about 40.0 in/year of precipitation, has a wetness index of 300.67, and is about 71% forested.

See also
List of Pennsylvania Rivers

References

Rivers of Pennsylvania
Rivers of Washington County, Pennsylvania